Matters of the Bittersweet is the first solo acoustic album by singer Matthew Santos. Released in November 2007 under Candy Rat Records, the album features addition of four songs where he is joined by band members Robert Tucker on 'Humming'burd' and Aviva Jaye on vocals and clarinet on three songs; 'Unnamable', 'Daughter of the Sun', and 'Drop a Coin'. The video recordings off "Matters of the Bittersweet" are among the top rated videos on YouTube.

In an interview with Billboard Magazine, Santos said about Matters of the Bittersweet, "It was all done live with one mic in my basement... nothing glamorous. I want to stay with that rootsy feel."

Track listing

References

2007 albums